The Stadion in der Witz is a stadium in Mainz-Kastel, Wiesbaden, Germany, with a capacity of 5,000. It is currently used for football matches and is the home ground of FVgg Kastel 06.

References 

Football venues in Germany
Sport in Wiesbaden
Buildings and structures in Wiesbaden
Sports venues in Hesse